Dylan McLaughlin (born 19 February 1995 in Greenock) is a Scottish footballer who plays for junior side Port Glasgow.

He started his senior career with Greenock Morton in the Scottish Football League First Division.

Career

McLaughlin made his senior debut at the age of 18, as a substitute against Falkirk on 4 May 2013.

He was released in August 2013, along with Ewan McLean. In September, he signed for Largs Thistle, managed by Morton youth coach Sandy MacLean.

After a spell at Largs Thistle, McLaughlin is now playing for Port Glasgow.

See also
Greenock Morton F.C. season 2012-13

References

External links

1995 births
Living people
Scottish footballers
Footballers from Greenock
Association football midfielders
Greenock Morton F.C. players
Scottish Football League players
Partick Thistle F.C. players
Scottish Junior Football Association players
Largs Thistle F.C. players
Port Glasgow F.C. players